Triodide may refer to:

 (usually lower case) a common misspelling for triiodide, the I3− ion in chemistry
 (usually capitalized) Orion Safety and Pacific Dynamics trademarked brand name for Trifluoroiodomethane